Mombum, or Kemelom (Komolom), is a Trans–New Guinea language spoken on Yos Sudarso Island (Kolopom Island) in West New Guinea.

Phonology
Mombum phonemic inventory:

Consonants b, ᵐb, d, ⁿd, ⁿʤ, ɡ, t, k, f, s, z, ʃ, ɣ, m, n, ŋ, r, l, w, z, j

Vowels a, e, ɛ , i, o, u, ʏ

References

Mombum languages
Languages of Indonesia
Languages of western New Guinea